A statue of Olav Tryggvason  is located in Trondheim, Norway. Sculpted by sculptor Wilhelm Rasmussen, it honors King Olav Tryggvason who was the city's founder.

The 18-metre (58-foot) high statue is  mounted on top of an obelisk. It stands at the center of the city square (Torvet i Trondheim)  at the intersection of the two main streets, Munkegata and Kongens gate.  The statue was unveiled in 1921. Around the statue base is a cobblestone mosaic, dating from 1930, which forms a gigantic sun dial . The sun dial is calibrated to UTC+1, meaning that the reading is inaccurate by one hour in the summer.

Gallery

References

External links
Torvet i Trondheim

Buildings and structures in Trondheim
Monuments and memorials in Norway
Tourist attractions in Trondheim
Sundials